The Columbus–Auburn–Opelika, GA–AL Combined Statistical Area is a trading and marketing area made up of six counties in Georgia and two in Alabama. The statistical area includes two metropolitan areas: the Columbus metropolitan area and the Auburn–Opelika metropolitan area. As of the 2020 Census, the CSA had a population of 483,104.

The Combined Statistical Area consists of the:
 Columbus metropolitan area, population 319,643.
 Auburn–Opelika metropolitan area, population 163,461.

Counties

In Georgia
 Chattahoochee County pop. 9,565
 Harris County pop. 34,668	
 Marion County pop. 7,498	
 Muscogee County pop. 206,922
 Stewart County pop. 5,314
 Talbot County pop. 5,733

In Alabama
 Lee County pop. 163,461
 Russell County pop. 57,938

Communities
The communities (both incorporated and unincorporated) in the combined statistical area are as follows. Bold name indicates the principal cities in the CSA:
In Alabama

In Georgia

Education institutes

Higher education

Public
 Auburn University 
Columbus State University
Columbus Technical College
 Chattahoochee Valley Community College (Phenix City)
Georgia Military College - main campus in Milledgeville, Georgia
 Southern Union State Community College (Opelika)
Troy University - campuses in Columbus, Fort Benning, and Phenix City, main campus in Troy, Alabama

Private, for profit
 Christian Life School of Theology (Columbus)
Miller-Motte Technical College - main campus in Wilmington, North Carolina
 Rivertown School of Beauty (Columbus)
 Southeastern Beauty School (Columbus)
Strayer University - main campus in Baltimore, Maryland

Primary and secondary education

Transportation

Airports
Below is a list of the airports in the greater area, followed by their number of enplanements (commercial passenger boardings) that occurred at the airport in calendar year 2008.

Public
 Auburn-Opelika Robert G. Pitts Airport , 68
 Columbus Airport , 51,288

Private 
 Harris County Airport , 116
 Jones Light Aviation Airport , n/a
 Lawson Army Airfield , 13,702
 Marion County Airport , n/a

Interstates
  Interstate 85
 Interstate 185

Principal Highways
  U.S. Route 27
  U.S. Route 29
  U.S. Route 80
  U.S. Route 280
  U.S. Route 431

State Highways
  Alabama State Route 14
  Alabama State Route 26
  Alabama State Route 51
  Alabama State Route 147
  Alabama State Route 165
  Alabama State Route 169
  Alabama State Route 267
  Georgia State Route 18
  Georgia State Route 22
  Georgia State Route 26
  Georgia State Route 27
  Georgia State Route 30
  Georgia State Route 36
  Georgia State Route 39
  Georgia State Route 41
  Georgia State Route 85
  Georgia State Route 90
  Georgia State Route 96
  Georgia State Route 103
  Georgia State Route 116
  Georgia State Route 127
  Georgia State Route 137
  Georgia State Route 190
  Georgia State Route 208
  Georgia State Route 219
  Georgia State Route 240
  Georgia State Route 315
  Georgia State Route 352
  Georgia State Route 354
  Georgia State Route 355
  Georgia State Route 520
  Georgia State Route 540

Sports

Shopping
Below are some notable shopping centers in the area:
 Columbus Park Crossing (Columbus)
 Peachtree Mall (Columbus)
 The Landings (Columbus)
 The Shoppes at Bradley Park (Columbus)
 TigerTown (Opelika)
 Auburn Mall (Auburn)

Notable people

References

Auburn, Alabama
Columbus metropolitan area, Georgia
Auburn metropolitan area, Alabama
Geography of Columbus, Georgia
Combined statistical areas of the United States